Huacullani (in Hispanicized spelling) or Waqullani (Aymara waqulla jug, pitcher, -ni a suffix to indicate ownership, "the one with a jug") is a location in the La Paz Department in Bolivia.

References

Populated places in La Paz Department (Bolivia)